Ramanallur is a small islet located amid Kollidam river. It is a part of Alagiyamanavalam Revenue Village and Panchayat, Ariyalur taluka of Ariyalur district in Tamil Nadu, India.

Geography

Ramanallur consists of Mela Ramanallur and Kizha Ramanallur.

There are only 4 streets in Mela Ramanallur, which are:
 Vadukku Theru (North Street)
 Mela Theru (West Street)
 Therkku Theru (South Street)
 Keela Theru

Kizha Ramanallur is another islet located near to Mela Ramanallur amid Kollidam river.

Demographics
Ramanallur had a total population of about 2500. Males constitute 50% of the population and females 50%. Ramanallur has an average literacy rate of 55%. 11% of the population is under 6 years of age.

Connection to mainland
If they want to move on north side to Thirumanur in Ariyalur district or to the south side to Kabisthalam and Papanasam in Thanjavur district, It is a difficult task. During summer, they use bullock carts to cross the Kollidam river to a distance of 1 km on either side. In rainy season, they use coracle when the river is full or wade through waist deep water. When the river is in spate, they are completely cut off from mainland even by the above modes of transport i.e. they are in distress.

External links
 A village struggling sans ‘basic connectivity’
 Ramanallur Islet in Hindu Images.com
 Ramanallur Islet was cut off from the rest of the district
 http://tamil.thehindu.com/tamilnadu/%E0%AE%A4%E0%AE%9E%E0%AF%8D%E0%AE%9A%E0%AF%88-%E0%AE%A4%E0%AE%BF%E0%AE%B0%E0%AF%81%E0%AE%B5%E0%AE%BE%E0%AE%B0%E0%AF%82%E0%AE%B0%E0%AF%8D-%E0%AE%AA%E0%AF%86%E0%AE%B0%E0%AE%AE%E0%AF%8D%E0%AE%AA%E0%AE%B2%E0%AF%82%E0%AE%B0%E0%AE%BF%E0%AE%B2%E0%AF%8D-%E0%AE%B0%E0%AF%82287-%E0%AE%95%E0%AF%8B%E0%AE%9F%E0%AE%BF%E0%AE%AF%E0%AE%BF%E0%AE%B2%E0%AF%8D-%E0%AE%A8%E0%AF%80%E0%AE%B0%E0%AF%8D%E0%AE%A4%E0%AF%8D%E0%AE%A4%E0%AF%87%E0%AE%95%E0%AF%8D%E0%AE%95%E0%AE%AE%E0%AF%8D-%E0%AE%A4%E0%AE%9F%E0%AF%81%E0%AE%AA%E0%AF%8D%E0%AE%AA%E0%AE%A3%E0%AF%88%E0%AE%95%E0%AE%B3%E0%AF%8D-%E0%AE%AE%E0%AF%81%E0%AE%A4%E0%AE%B2%E0%AF%8D%E0%AE%B5%E0%AE%B0%E0%AF%8D-%E0%AE%89%E0%AE%A4%E0%AF%8D%E0%AE%A4%E0%AE%B0%E0%AE%B5%E0%AF%81/article5256501.ece

Villages in Ariyalur district